Christine Guthrie (1945-2022) was an American yeast geneticist and American Cancer Society Research Professor of Genetics at University of California San Francisco. She showed that yeast have small nuclear RNAs (snRNAs) involved in splicing pre-messenger RNA into messenger RNA in eukaryotic cells.  Guthrie cloned and sequenced the genes for yeast snRNA and established the role of base pairing between the snRNAs and their target sequences at each step in the removal of an intron. She also identified proteins that formed part of the spliceosome complex with the snRNAs. Elected to the National Academy of Sciences in 1993,  Guthrie edited Guide to Yeast Genetics and Molecular Biology, an influential methods series for many years.

Early life and education 
Christine Guthrie was born in Brooklyn, New York.  She received a BS in Zoology from University of Michigan and a PhD in genetics from University of Wisconsin. Her PhD advisor was Masayasu Nomura.

She was the daughter of Brooklyn native and humorist Irene Kampen, whose book, Life Without George, was the basis for The Lucy Show, which aired for six seasons on CBS in the 1960s. (Lucy's daughter on the show was named Chris.)

Academic career 
In 1973, she was hired as an assistant professor at University of California, San Francisco (UCSF).  After a tough pre-tenure review in 1976, she found support in a group of women and men who met informally for 20 years to help each other thrive in academia.   She was a professor of biochemistry and American Cancer Society Research Professor of Genetics at UCSF.

Research 
Guthrie showed that yeast have introns in their pre-messenger RNAs.  They also have small nuclear RNAs (snRNAs) involved in splicing pre-messenger RNA into messenger RNA in eukaryotic cells. 2 In work described in her citation for the Genetics Society of America Medal as a “macromolecular tour de force”, she cloned and sequenced the SNR genes for the yeast snRNAs. To accomplish this feat, she had to invent methods to discriminate functional snRNAs from degradation products and also to create widely used intron-containing reporter genes. Her work established the role of base pairing between the snRNAs and their target sequences at each step in the removal of an intron and allowed identification of proteins that formed part of the spliceosome complex with the snRNAs.

Personal life 
Guthrie was married to John Abelson, biochemist and geneticist.

Awards 

 1993 National Academy of Sciences
 1997 Genetics Society of America Medal
 1998 WICB Senior Career Recognition Award (American Society for Cell Biology)
 2006 The RNA Society Lifetime Achievement Award
 2011 ASBMB-Merck Award

Works

Selected scientific papers 

 Brow D. A., Guthrie C., 1988 “Spliceosomal RNA U6 is remarkably conserved from yeast to mammals.” Nature 334: 213–218.
 Burgess S., Couto J. R., Guthrie C., 1990 “A putative ATP binding protein influences the fidelity of branchpoint recognition in yeast splicing.” Cell 60: 705–717.
 Burgess S. M., Guthrie C., 1993 “A mechanism to enhance mRNA splicing fidelity: the RNA-dependent ATPase Prp16 governs usage of a discard pathway for aberrant lariat intermediates.” Cell 73: 1377–1391.
 Cellini A., Parker R., McMahon J., Guthrie C., Rossi J., 1986 “Activation of a cryptic TACTAAC box in the Saccharomyces cerevisiae actin intron.” Mol. Cell Biol. 6: 1571–1578.
 Couto J. R., Tamm J., Parker R., Guthrie C., 1987 “A trans-acting suppressor restores splicing of a yeast intron with a branch point mutation.” Genes Dev. 1: 445–455.
 Guthrie C., 1991 “Messenger RNA splicing in yeast: clues to why the spliceosome is a ribonucleoprotein.” Science 253: 157–163.
 Guthrie C., Nashimoto H., Nomura M., 1969 “Structure and function of E. coli ribosomes. 8. Cold-sensitive mutants defective in ribosome assembly.” Proc. Natl. Acad. Sci. USA 63: 384–391.
 Guthrie C., Patterson B., 1988 “Spliceosomal snRNAs.” Annu. Rev. Genet. 22: 387–419.
 Jandrositz A., Guthrie C., 1995 “Evidence for a Prp24 binding site in U6 snRNA and in a putative intermediate in the annealing of U6 and U4 snRNAs.” Euro Mol Biol Org J. 14: 820–832.
 Lesser C. F., Guthrie C. 1993 “Mutations in U6 snRNA that alter splice site specificity: Implications for the active site.” Science 262: 1982–1988.
 Madhani H. D., Bordonne R., Guthrie C. 1990 “Multiple roles for U6 snRNA in the splicing pathway.” Genes Dev. 4: 2264–2277.
 Madhani H. D., Guthrie C., 1992 “A novel base-pairing interaction between U2 and U6 snRNAs suggests a mechanism for the catalytic activation of the spliceosome.” Cell 71: 803–817.
 Madhani H. D., Guthrie C., 1994 “Dynamic RNA-RNA interactions in the spliceosome.” Annu. Rev. Genet. 28: 1–26.
 Noble S. M., Guthrie C., 1996 “Identification of novel genes required for yeast pre-mRNA splicing by means of cold-sensitive mutations.” Genetics 143: 67–80.
 Parker R., Guthrie C., 1985 “A point mutation in the conserved hexanucleotide at a yeast 5′ splice junction uncouples recognition, cleavage, and ligation.” Cell 41: 107–118.
 Parker R., Siliciano P. G., Guthrie C., 1987 “Recognition of the TACTAAC box during mRNA splicing in yeast involves base pairing to the U2-like snRNA.” Cell 49: 229–239.
 Patterson B., Guthrie C., 1987 “An essential yeast snRNA with a U5-like domain is required for splicing in vivo.” Cell 49: 613–624.
 Riedel N., Wise J. A., Swerdlow H., Mak A., Guthrie C., 1986 “Small nuclear RNAs from Saccharomyces cerevisiae: unexpected diversity in abundance, size, and molecular complexity.” Proc Natl. Acad. Sci. USA 83: 8097–8101.
 Schwer B., Guthrie C., 1991 “PRP16 is an RNA-dependent ATPase that interacts transiently with the spliceosome.” Nature 349: 494–499.
 Schwer B., Guthrie C., 1992 “A conformational rearrangement in the spliceosome is dependent on PRP16 and ATP hydrolysis.” Euro Mol Bio Org J. 11: 5033–5039.
 Shannon K. W., Guthrie C., 1991 “Suppressors of a U4 snRNA mutation define a novel U6 snRNP protein with RNA-binding motifs.” Genes Dev. 5: 773–785.
 Siliciano P. G., Brow D. A., Roiha H., Guthrie C., 1987a “An essential snRNA from S. cerevisiae has properties predicted for U4, including interaction with a U6-like snRNA.” Cell 50: 585–592.
 Siliciano P. G., Jones M. H., Guthrie C., 1987b “Saccharomyces cerevisiae has a U1-like small nuclear RNA with unexpected properties.” Science 237: 1484–1487.
 Siliciano P. G., Guthrie C., 1988 “5′ splice site selection in yeast: genetic alterations in base-pairing with U1 reveal additional requirements.” Genes Dev. 2: 1258–1267.
 Strauss E. J., Guthrie C., 1991 “A cold-sensitive mRNA splicing mutant is a member of the RNA helicase gene family.” Genes Dev. 5: 629–641.
 Vijayraghavan U., Parker R., Tamm J., Iimura Y., Rossi J., et al., 1986 “Mutations in conserved intron sequences affect multiple steps in the yeast splicing pathway, particularly assembly of the spliceosome.” Euro Mol Bio Org J. 5: 1683–1695.
 Wise J. A., Tollervey D., Maloney D., Swerdlow H., Dunn E. J., et al., 1983 “Yeast contains small nuclear RNAs encoded by single copy genes.” Cell 35: 743–751.

Books 

 Christine Guthrie, editor 2002 Guide to Yeast Genetics and Molecular and Cell Biology, Part B, Methods in Enzymology Volume 350  Academic Press.  
 Christine Guthrie and Gerald R. Fink, editors. 2002 Guide to Yeast Genetics and Molecular and Cell Biology, Part A Methods in Enzymology volume 351 Academic Press.
 Christine Guthrie and Gerald R. Fink, editors.  2002 Guide to Yeast Genetics and Molecular Cell Biology Part B Methods in Enzymology volume 351 Academic Press.
 Christine Guthrie and Gerald R. Fink, editors. 2002  Guide to Yeast Genetics and Molecular Cell Biology Part C Methods in Enzymology volume 351 Academic Press.
 Jonathan Weisman, Christine Guthrie, and Gerald Fink editors, 2010. Guide to Yeast Genetics: Functional Genomics, Proteomics and other Systems Analysis.  Methods in Enzymology  volume 470 2nd edition Academic Press.

References 

American women geneticists
Living people
American geneticists
People from Brooklyn
University of California, San Francisco faculty
University of Michigan alumni
University of Wisconsin–Madison College of Agricultural and Life Sciences alumni
Members of the United States National Academy of Sciences
Scientists from New York (state)
Fellows of the American Academy of Microbiology
1945 births